Fuad Subašić (born May 17, 1948) is a Bosnian former footballer who played as a midfielder.

Career 
Subašić played with NK Slaven Živinice in 1963. In 1967, he played in the Yugoslav Second League with FK Sloboda Tuzla, and assisted in securing promotion to the Yugoslav First League in 1969. He featured in the 1970–71 Yugoslav Cup final, but lost the series to Red Star Belgrade. In the summer of 1974 he played abroad in the National Soccer League with Toronto Croatia. In the fall of 1974 he played with FK Radnik Bijeljina.

References  
 

Living people
1948 births
Bosnia and Herzegovina footballers
Yugoslav footballers
Yugoslav expatriate footballers
Association football midfielders
FK Sloboda Tuzla players
Toronto Croatia players
FK Radnik Bijeljina players
Yugoslav First League players
Yugoslav Second League players
Canadian National Soccer League players
Expatriate soccer players in Canada
Yugoslav expatriate sportspeople in Canada
People from Živinice
Bosniaks of Bosnia and Herzegovina